

Plants

Angiosperms

Conodonts

Amphibians

Newly named basal diapsids

Dinosaurs

Newly named dinosaurs
Data courtesy of George Olshevsky's dinosaur genera list.

Synapsids

Non-mammalian

References

1920s in paleontology
Paleontology
Paleontology 6